Xiangyun is a town in Wen County, Henan province, China. , it administers the following 28 villages:
Xiangyun Village 
Dongnanwang Village
Dashang Village
Xihe Village
Zhangsi Village
Zuoli Village
Xuezhao Village
Wangzhao Village
Guanzhao Village
Chaozhao Village
Liushang Village
Guxian Village
Xiazhuang Village
Luopodi Village
Suzhuang Village
Yanzhuang Village
Zhaoma Village
Wuzhang Village
Dayulan Village
Nanjia Village
Beijia Village
Lizhao Village
Taikang Village
Wangyangdian Village
Xigou Village
Wangfen Village
Shiqu Village
Peilingxin Village

References

Township-level divisions of Henan
Wen County, Henan